The Coulomb constant, the electric force constant, or the electrostatic constant (denoted ,  or ) is a proportionality constant in electrostatics equations. It was named after the French physicist Charles-Augustin de Coulomb (1736–1806) who introduced Coulomb's law.

Value of the constant 

The Coulomb constant is the constant of proportionality in Coulomb's law,

where  is a unit vector in the -direction. In SI, 

where  is the vacuum permittivity.  This formula can be derived from Gauss' law,

Taking this integral for a sphere, radius , centered on a point charge, the electric field points radially outwards and is normal to a differential surface element on the sphere with constant magnitude for all points on the sphere.

Noting that  for some test charge ,

Coulomb's law is an inverse-square law, and thereby similar to many other scientific laws ranging from gravitational pull to light attenuation. This law states that a specified physical quantity is inversely proportional to the square of the distance.

In some modern systems of units, the Coulomb constant  has an exact numeric value; in Gaussian units , in Heaviside–Lorentz units (also called rationalized) .

Since the redefinition of SI base units, the Coulomb constant is no longer has an exactly defined value and is subject to the measurement error in the fine structure constant, as calculated from CODATA 2018 recommended values being

Use 

The Coulomb constant is used in many electric equations, although it is frequently expressed as the following product of the vacuum permittivity constant:

The Coulomb constant appears in many expressions including the following:

 Coulomb's law
 
 Electric potential energy
 
 Electric field

See also 
 Gravitational constant
 Vacuum permittivity
 Vacuum permeability
 Inverse-square law

References 

Electricity
Electromagnetism
Physical constants